was a Japanese football player and manager. He managed Japan national team.

Playing career
Nishida played for Osaka SC was founded by his alma mater high school graduates and many Japan national team players were playing in those days.

Coaching career
In 1923, Nishida became manager for Japan national team for 1923 Far Eastern Championship Games in Osaka. At this competition, on May 23, Japan fought against Philippines. This match is Japan team first match in International A Match. He managed 2 matches at this competition, but Japan lost in both matches (1-2, v Philippines and 1-5, v Republic of China).

References

Year of birth missing
Year of death missing
Japanese footballers
Japanese football managers
Japan national football team managers
Association football goalkeepers